The Football Spectators Act 1989 is an Act of the Parliament of the United Kingdom enacted during the premiership of Margaret Thatcher. Its provisions apply primarily to football matches played in England and Wales. Amendments to the Act were made through the Football (Offences and Disorder) Act 1999, the Football (Disorder) Act 2000, and the Violent Crime Reduction Act 2006, the last of which repealed large sections of the Football Spectators Act 1989.

The aim of the Act was to identify individuals known to cause disorder at and around football matches, whether in the UK itself or abroad. It was originally intended that fans would have to give a passport number to become part of a membership scheme and receive an identity card so as to go to away matches, but eventually this was not enacted.

Football-related offences
The Act and its amendments identifies a number of specific offences related to fan behaviour, including the throwing of objects onto the field or into the crowd; racist or obscene chanting at a match; violence against persons or property, including threats and endangerment of any person's life; a variety of alcohol-related offences; and the bringing or being in possession of fireworks into or at a designated sporting event. However, almost any criminal offence connected with a game that occurs within 24 hours on either end of a football match can also be designated as a football-related offence.

The Act also introduced the football banning order (FBO), under which a magistrate can ban an individual from attending football matches (whether either domestic or foreign) for a period of 2–10 years and can also impose additional restrictions. FBOs are usually imposed by the court after someone has been convicted of a football-related offence, although they can be imposed even on individuals charged but acquitted of such offences, or in response to police representations that the FBO would prevent football-related violence or disorder.

References

External links

History of football in England
United Kingdom Acts of Parliament 1989
Association football law
1989–90 in English football
Football in the United Kingdom